The Tom Smith House is a historic house on Arkansas Highway 74, east of Elkins, Arkansas in Washington County. It is a single-story brick structure, with a side gable roof, end chimneys, and a four-bay front facade. The bricks, which were locally made, are four courses deep, and end in a cornice shaped out of S-shaped molded bricks, an extremely rare detail. The front facade is asymmetrically arranged, with two doors in the center bays and sash windows in the outer bays. Built c. 1834, it is a rare regional example of late Georgian architecture, and is historically significant for its builder, Thomas Smith, who was one of the earliest white settlers of the area.

The house was listed on the National Register of Historic Places in 1992.

See also
National Register of Historic Places listings in Washington County, Arkansas

References

Houses on the National Register of Historic Places in Arkansas
Houses completed in 1834
Houses in Washington County, Arkansas
National Register of Historic Places in Washington County, Arkansas
Georgian Revival architecture in Arkansas
1834 establishments in Arkansas Territory